Bro (sometimes called Bro and Duss) is a populated area, a socken (not to be confused with parish), on the Swedish island of Gotland. It comprises the same area as the administrative Bro District, established on 1January 2016.

Geography 
Bro is the name of the socken as well as the district. It is also the name of the small village surrounding the medieval Bro Church, sometimes referred to as Bro kyrkby. It is situated in the northwest part of Gotland, northeast of Visby.

, Bro Church belongs to Väskinde parish in Norra Gotlands pastorat, along with the churches in Väskinde, Fole, Lokrume, Hejnum and
Bäl.

One of the asteroids in the asteroid belt, 10128 Bro, is named after this place.

Gallery

References

External links 

Objects from Bro at the Digital Museum by Nordic Museum

Populated places in Gotland County